Andrus Raadik (born 19 October 1986) is an Estonian volleyball player, a member of the Estonia men's national volleyball team and Finnish club Savo Volley.

Club career
Raadik was born in Pärnu, and started his career in hometown club Pärnu VK at the age of 20. He spent ten seasons in Pärnu and won the Estonian Championship once, the Baltic League once and the Estonian Cup three times. In 2016 he moved to Finland and signed with Pielaveden Sampo. With Sampo Raadik won two Finnish Championship bronze medals on was named the Finnish league MVP. He spent the 2018–19 season with another Finnish team Savo Volley. For  the 2019–20 season Raadik signed with Arhavi Belediyespor of the Turkish Men's Volleyball League. He parted ways with the club in December 2019 and joined Tunisian League top team CS Sfaxien. For the next season he returned to native Estonia and signed with Selver Tallinn.

National team
As a member of the senior Estonia men's national volleyball team, Raadik competed at the 2017 and 2019 European Volleyball Championships.

Sporting achievements

Clubs
Baltic League
  2010/2011 – with Pärnu
  2011/2012 – with Pärnu
  2012/2013 – with Pärnu
  2015/2016 – with Pärnu
  2020/2021 – with Selver Tallinn

National championship
 2006/2007  Estonian Championship, with Pärnu
 2007/2008  Estonian Championship, with Pärnu
 2008/2009  Estonian Championship, with Pärnu
 2009/2010  Estonian Championship, with Pärnu
 2010/2011  Estonian Championship, with Pärnu
 2011/2012  Estonian Championship, with Pärnu
 2012/2013  Estonian Championship, with Pärnu
 2013/2014  Estonian Championship, with Pärnu
 2014/2015  Estonian Championship, with Pärnu
 2015/2016  Estonian Championship, with Pärnu
 2016/2017  Finnish Championship, with Pielaveden Sampo
 2017/2018  Finnish Championship, with Pielaveden Sampo
 2020/2021  Estonian Championship, with Selver Tallinn
 2021/2022  Finnish Championship, with Savo Volley

National cup
 2009/2010  Estonian Cup, with Pärnu
 2010/2011  Estonian Cup, with Pärnu
 2012/2013  Estonian Cup, with Pärnu
 2014/2015  Estonian Cup, with Pärnu
 2015/2016  Estonian Cup, with Pärnu
 2016/2017  Finnish Cup, with Pielaveden Sampo
 2020/2021  Estonian Cup, with Selver Tallinn
 2021/2022  Finnish Cup, with Savo Volley

Individual
 2016 Baltic League – Best Outside Hitter
 2017 Finnish League – Most Valuable Player
 2022 Finnish Cup – Most Valuable Player

Personal
His younger brother Rain is a basketball player and a former member of the Estonian national basketball team.

References

1986 births
Living people
Estonian men's volleyball players
Estonian expatriate volleyball players
Estonian expatriate sportspeople in Finland
Expatriate volleyball players in Finland
Estonian expatriate sportspeople in Turkey
Expatriate volleyball players in Turkey
Expatriate volleyball players in Tunisia
Estonian expatriate sportspeople in Tunisia
Outside hitters
Sportspeople from Pärnu